Ephraim Mwangi Maina is a Kenyan politician and Member of Parliament. He belongs to Safina, and was elected to represent the Mathira Constituency in the National Assembly of Kenya since the 2007 Kenyan parliamentary election.

Maina is the founder and owner of Kirinyaga Construction, a construction company in Kenya.

References

Living people
Year of birth missing (living people)
Safina politicians
Members of the National Assembly (Kenya)